
Year 225 BC was a year of the pre-Julian Roman calendar. At the time it was known as the Year of the Consulship of Papus and Regulus (or, less frequently, year 529 Ab urbe condita). The denomination 225 BC for this year has been used since the early medieval period, when the Anno Domini calendar era became the prevalent method in Europe for naming years.

Events 
 By place 
 Roman Republic 
 A coalition of Cisalpine Gallic tribes (Taurini, Taurisces, Insubres, Lingones, Salasses, Agones, and Boii), reinforced by large numbers of Transalpine adventurers called Gaesatae (Gaesati), invade Italy. Avoiding the Romans at Ariminum, the Gauls cross the Apennines into Etruria and plunder the country.
 To meet this invasion, the Romans call on the Insubres' enemies, the Adriatic Veneti, the Patavini, and the Cenomani, who rapidly mobilise defensive forces. These armies are placed under the command of consuls Lucius Aemilius Papus and Gaius Atilius Regulus. After the Battle of Faesulae (near Montepulciano) between the Gauls and a Roman army in which the Romans lose many men, the combined Roman forces succeed in outmaneuvering the Gauls and force the invaders towards the coast of Tuscany.

 Seleucid Empire 
 Seleucus III Ceraunus succeeds his father Seleucus II Callinicus as ruler of the Seleucid dynasty, and takes up the task of reconquering Pergamum in Anatolia from Attalus. However, Andromachus, the first general whom he sends, is decisively defeated and captured by Attalus.

 China 
 The state of Qin, its armies led by Wang Ben, conquers the state of Wei.

Births

Deaths 
 Seleucus II Callinicus, king of the Seleucid Empire (246-225 BC)

References